Shoe Zone (stylised as shoezone) is a footwear retailer in the United Kingdom which sells shoes at low prices. It has over 410 stores in different cities and towns throughout the UK and Ireland and over 2,854 employees. The company has an annual turnover of £119 million. The company's headquarters are located in Leicester, England.

History
The company was founded in England in 1917. Brothers Michael and Christopher Smith bought controlling shares in the footwear company, Bensonshoe in 1980 which had founded by their grandfather. By 2000, the company had 184 stores and late that year acquired The Oliver Group plc which added a further 258 stores to its portfolio.

In September 2007, Shoe Zone acquired the shoe retailer Shoefayre for an undisclosed sum from its parent, The Co-operative Group, adding 300 stores to Shoe Zone's portfolio. In January 2009, it bought Leicester-based Stead & Simpson and converted many stores to the Shoe Zone brand.

In 2021 the company made headlines when Finance director Peter Foot was replaced by Terry Boot.

The company suffered from the Covid-19 crisis and related lockdowns which resulted in declining revenue. In 2020, Shoe Zone raised debt for the first time in 15 years with a £15M CLBILS facility from NatWest.

Up-To-Date Position

In 2021 Shoe Zone bounced back to profit of £9.5M and the company announced it was already debt free in January 2022.

Operations

The company sells approximately 16 million pairs of footwear per year. Shoe Zone also has a charity known as the Shoe Zone Trust which donates a proportion of the company's profits to charitable organisations targeting children in poverty.

Amount of donations: over £350,000.

References

External links 
 
 

Shoe companies of the United Kingdom
Companies based in Leicester
Retail companies established in 1980
1980 establishments in England
Footwear retailers
Companies listed on the Alternative Investment Market